Gannon University is a private Catholic university in Erie, Pennsylvania. Gannon University has approximately 4,500 students and 46,000 alumni. Its intercollegiate athletics include 18 athletic programs for men and women competing at the NCAA Division II level.

History
Gannon University was first established in 1933 as the two-year Cathedral College by the Diocese of Erie. In 1944, the school became the four-year men's school Gannon College of Arts and Sciences, named in honor of the then-Bishop of Erie, John Mark Gannon, the driving force behind its opening and development. The college became coeducational in 1964 and gained university status in 1979.

The all-girls school Villa Maria College, which was founded by the Sisters of St. Joseph in 1925, merged with the university in 1989. Its Villa Maria School of Nursing retains the name of the original institution.

Academics

The university is organized into three main colleges: the College of Engineering and Business, which includes the Dahlkemper School of Business Administration; the College of Humanities, Education and Social Sciences; and the Morosky College of Health Professions and Sciences.

Campus
Gannon University's campus is located in downtown Erie, primarily concentrated between Peach and Myrtle Streets and 3rd and 10th Streets. In summer 2015, a doctoral branch campus opened in Ruskin, Florida focusing on healthcare majors.

Athletics
Gannon is a member of the Pennsylvania State Athletic Conference in NCAA Division II.  Gannon offers 19 Division II scholarship-granting varsity sports, that includes nine men's and women's teams. The men participate in baseball, basketball, cross country, football, golf, soccer, swimming, water polo, wrestling, competitive cheer. The women participate in basketball, cross country, golf, lacrosse, soccer, softball, swimming, volleyball, water polo, wrestling, acrobatics and tumbling, and competitive cheer and dance. 

In June 2007, Gannon University, along with cross-town rival Mercyhurst College, was accepted into the Pennsylvania State Athletic Conference, where area schools Edinboro University of Pennsylvania and Slippery Rock University of Pennsylvania are members.  Along with Gannon and Mercyhurst as full members, LIU Post also was accepted into the conference as an affiliate member.

Greek life
Fraternities:
Delta Kappa Epsilon
Delta Sigma Phi
Delta Chi
Zeta Beta Tau
Pi Kappa Alpha
Tau Kappa Epsilon

Sororities:
Alpha Gamma Delta
Alpha Sigma Alpha
Alpha Sigma Tau
Sigma Sigma Sigma

Notable alumni
Kevin Benson, Meteorologist for WPXI in Pittsburgh
John Brabender, Republican political consultant
Italo Cappabianca, former Democratic member of the Pennsylvania House of Representatives
Daniel Cudmore, Canadian actor and stuntman
Marjorie Diehl-Armstrong, convicted murderer
James Dubik, Lieutenant General in the United States Army
Isaiah Eisendorf (born 1996), American-Israeli basketball player in the Israeli Basketball Premier League
William Gehrlein, researcher
Matthew W. Good, former member of the Pennsylvania House of Representatives
Steve Grilli, former Major League Baseball player
Robert J. Heibel, retired FBI Agent
John Hornaman, former member of the Pennsylvania House of Representatives
Lori Jakiela, author
Andy Lorei, professional soccer player for the Tulsa Roughnecks
Jabs Newby, professional basketball player
Mark L. Nelson, chemist, scientist and inventor of Omadacycline, a tetracycline antibiotic 
Bill Pepicello, President of the University of Phoenix
Rocco Pugliese, lobbyist in Pennsylvania
Brad Roae, Member of the Pennsylvania House of Representatives 2007–present
Joe Schember, 48th Mayor of Erie, Pennsylvania (2018–present)
Joseph E. Sinnott, 47th Mayor of Erie, Pennsylvania (2006–2018)
R. Tracy Seyfert, former member of the Pennsylvania House of Representatives
John Stehr, former CBS News Correspondent, currently main anchor at WTHR in Indianapolis 
Thomas Joseph Tobin, prelate of the Roman Catholic Church
Barbara Smith Warner, member of the Oregon House of Representatives, representing District 45
James G. Zimmerly, physician and co-discoverer of a meningococcal vaccine

References

External links

Gannon Athletics website

 
Catholic universities and colleges in Pennsylvania
Educational institutions established in 1925
Education in Erie, Pennsylvania
Universities and colleges in Erie County, Pennsylvania
Association of Catholic Colleges and Universities
1925 establishments in Pennsylvania